Slover Mountain (Mount Slover, Marble Mountain) is a former mountain in Colton, in southwestern San Bernardino County and the Inland Empire region of Southern California. Now a hill, it was surface mined for limestone in the 20th century. The Colton Joint Unified School District's continuation high school is named after the mountain.

The mountain was known as Tahualtapa ("raven hill") by Native Americans and Cerrito Solo ("little solitary hill") by the colonial Spanish.

History
The hill was named after a local 19th century hunter, Isaac Slover, who lived near it and who died in 1854 in the Cajon Pass from injuries caused by a bear. The Colton Liberty Flag formerly stood atop the mountain.

References

External links 

 Cement Mountain by Ben Sakoguchi
 San Bernardino County List of Stone Quarries, etc.
 Mountain Shifts Slowly From Stone to Cement at the Los Angeles Times
 Landmark flag in Colton is retired at The Press-Enterprise
 More than half-sorry about Slover Mountain at the Los Angeles Daily News
 History of Slover Avenue at the city of San Bernardino's website

Former landforms
Mountains of San Bernardino County, California
Hills of California
Colton, California
History of San Bernardino County, California
Mountains of Southern California
Natural history of San Bernardino County, California